El Teneen (Arabic, "the Dragon") is the pseudonym of an anonymous -year-old Egyptian street artist and graffiti artist whose work gained popularity and notoriety in Egypt following the 2011 Revolution. El Teneen originally formed one half of the pair "Team El Teneen", or "Dragon Team"; however, the artist (identified by Al-Masry Al-Youm newspaper as a male) now works primarily independently. His works of art have been described as "icons of the 25 January revolution."

He exhibited at Banksy's 2015 Dismaland "bemusement park" in England.

Career and politics

El Teneen was not an experienced artist before the 2011 revolution, having focused primarily on abstract painting and studying a field related to science, and he reportedly works in graphic design. Since the revolution, his work has been noted for its revolutionary character and its criticism of SCAF. A self-described graffiti artist, El Teneen says on his associated Twitter profile that "I spray shit on walls in Cairo streets."

Political street art was not common in Egypt prior to the 2011 revolution, but proliferated in public spaces in the post-revolution era. Artwork targeting the Supreme Council of the Armed Forces, or SCAF, in particular surged in popularity since the revolution because, according to The Christian Science Monitor, such "anti-military graffiti is a reflection of Egyptian activists' frustration with the military rulers, who they say replaced one autocracy with another." However, although graffiti in particular has proliferated in Egyptian cities since the revolution, El Teneen has noted that most of it "is not political ... Maybe we can say that people are expressing themselves, but the streets aren't ours yet." El Teneen has said that his artwork is not solely political: "Even if the political situation here is resolved ... we will still have to talk about women, religion and other issues."

Artwork
El Teneen's artwork has been noted for its political nature. In particular, a spray-painted image of a chessboard depicting a toppled king surrounded by bishops, knights and rooks opposed by several rows of amassed pawns that the artist drew on the campus of the American University in Cairo was widely noted. El Teneen's work is not solely political; he participated in an exhibition entitled "Black and White," in which he depicted a series of cultural icons of Egyptian cinema, including Umm Kulthum and Hind Rostom.

El Teneen exhibited at Banksy's 2015 Dismaland "bemusement park" in England.

See also
Chico (Egyptian artist)
Ganzeer
Keizer (artist)
List of urban artists
 Egyptian Arts post 2011 Revolution

References

External links
El Teneen's website
Facebook profile
Interview with Al-Masry Al-Youm English

Egyptian graffiti artists
Egyptian graphic designers
Living people
Pseudonymous artists
Egyptian contemporary artists
Year of birth missing (living people)